The Taebaek Mountains is a 1994 South Korean film directed by Im Kwon-taek.

Plot
The film originates from the great river story Taebaegsanmaek consisting of 10 volumes written by Cho Jeong-rae. The story describes generational conflict between the haves (proprietors and landlords) and have nots (peasants) that eventually develops into right and left wing ideology, respectively. While showing why and how the conflict came about, the story depicts romantic, shamanic and Confucian aspects of the contemporaries. It provides a further insight into the politically controversial ideological issue on which the viewpoint is virtually hardened among over 40's in South Korea. This ideological issue survives even in the digital age to have a substantial effect on presidential elections. The author dares to show what the ideological conflict derives from and tries to describe it in detail and with artistic skill of commanding Korean colloquial language supplying its readers the true taste of Korean dialect expressions especially in its southwestern part Jeolla province.

Reception
Korean film scholar Kim Kyung-hyun described the reception of The Taebaek Mountains by audiences and critics as "lukewarm."

Awards

Wins
Blue Dragon Film Awards Best Film (1994)

Nominations
Golden Bear, 45th Berlin International Film Festival (Im Kwon-taek) (1995)

Presented
Telluride Film Festival (1999)

References

External links

Films directed by Im Kwon-taek
1990s Korean-language films
South Korean drama films
Best Picture Blue Dragon Film Award winners